Jure Ivanković (born 15 November 1985) is a Bosnian professional football manager and former player.

International career
Ivanković made his debut for Bosnia and Herzegovina in a December 2010 friendly match against Poland. It remained his sole international appearance.

Managerial statistics

Honours

Player
Široki Brijeg
Bosnian Cup: 2012–13, 2016–17

References

External links

1985 births
Living people
People from Široki Brijeg
Croats of Bosnia and Herzegovina
Association football midfielders
Bosnia and Herzegovina footballers
Bosnia and Herzegovina international footballers
NK Široki Brijeg players
NK Imotski players 
HŠK Posušje players
Premier League of Bosnia and Herzegovina players
First Football League (Croatia) players
Bosnia and Herzegovina expatriate footballers
Expatriate footballers in Croatia
Bosnia and Herzegovina expatriate sportspeople in Croatia
Bosnia and Herzegovina football managers
Premier League of Bosnia and Herzegovina managers
NK Široki Brijeg managers